Juho Kusti Paasikivi's third cabinet  was the 30th government of Republic of Finland. Cabinet's time period was from April 17, 1945 – March 26, 1946. It was Majority government.

Paasikivi, 3
1945 establishments in Finland
1946 disestablishments in Finland
Cabinets established in 1945
Cabinets disestablished in 1946